The William K. Gordon Scholarship Fund is a Dutch Foundation set up in the early 1970s to promote international education in Rotterdam, the Netherlands.

Background 
The William K. Gordon Scholarship Fund became an official Foundation (Stichting) on 1 February 1974, to provide a public service to the members of the international community living and working in the Rotterdam area.   The purpose of the Scholarship Fund is to promote international education by means of scholarships or loans to be made available to, or on behalf of students at the American International School of Rotterdam (AISR).  AISR became Nord Anglia International School Rotterdam in 2019.

Among the many deserving students assisted through the years, in 2017 the fund supported the application of a gifted child of a Syrian refugee family.  Funds for the Foundation have been drawn from the proceeds of the sale of best-selling English-language guide books to the Netherlands, together with donations from international companies and corporations.

Gallery

References

Further reading 

 "Here’s Holland: Its Own Story" The Book and Scholarship Fund. (2017) Going Dutch, AWC The Hague, May/June 2017, p. 38-39
 Stichting William K. Gordon Scholarship Fund Charter, February 16, 1974, Rotterdam, Netherlands (KvK 41126091)
 Focus, Expat (2017) "Rotterdam - Education & Schools | ExpatFocus.com". Retrieved 2017-06-29.
 Roaming 'round Rotterdam (1973) [1st Edition] Rotterdam, Netherlands: Rotterdam Information Department, pp. 306; Roaming 'round Holland (1978) [3rd edition] Utrecht: Van Boekhoven/Bosch, pp. 426; Here’s Holland (2007) [9th edition] Delft, Netherlands: Eburon BV, pp. 492
 Study in the Netherlands: Grants and scholarships, Expatica.com

Charities based in the Netherlands
Rotterdam